Theatergemeinschaft Amerang is a theatre company based in Amerang, Bavaria, Germany.

External links

Theatre companies in Germany